Ballymurphy, historically Ballymurchoe, is a village in County Carlow, Ireland on the R702 regional road. It lies on the western flank of the Blackstairs Mountains.

Ballymurphy lies between the Carlow town of Borris and the Wexford village of Kiltealy.

See also
 List of towns and villages in Ireland

References

Towns and villages in County Carlow